The Wallowa County Chieftain is a weekly newspaper in Enterprise, Wallowa County in the U.S. state of Oregon. Founded in Joseph in 1884 by S. A. Heckethorn, it preceded the  establishment of the county itself. A few years after Enterprise was selected as the county seat, the paper relocated there. Though the newspaper was named after Chief Joseph, it was not particularly friendly to Native American issues, and opposed a Joseph's request to resettle Wallowa Valley in 1900.

George Cheney became the owner, editor, and publisher in 1911, on the wave of an economic boom experienced in Enterprise upon the completion of a railroad and sawmill, as well as a booming agricultural business. Cheney built a new building, designed to meet the needs of the paper, which it occupied beginning in 1916. Cheney sold the newspaper in 1941, and the building in 1943, to Gwen Coffin. Coffin, who brought a more controversial approach to the paper, owned it until 1972.

In a 2006 article about Joseph, the New York Times cited the Chieftain's coverage of a new grocery store.

The building used by the paper from 1916 to 2007 has been on the National Register of Historic Places since 2012.

References 

1884 establishments in Oregon
Enterprise, Oregon
Newspapers published in Oregon
Publications established in 1884